Bacteriohopanepolyols (BHPs), bacteriohopanoids, or bacterial pentacyclic triterpenoids are commonly found in the lipid cell membranes of many bacteria. BHPs are frequently used as biomarkers in sedimentary rocks and can provide paleoecological information about ancient bacterial communities.

See also
Hopane

References

Terpenes and terpenoids